Hasanabad (also Romanized as Ḩasanābād) is a village in Eypak Rural District in the Central District of Eshtehard County, Alborz Province, Iran. At the 2006 census, its population was 47, in 12 families.

References 

Populated places in Eshtehard County